Luciano Rocha is a Brazilian Paralympic footballer.

Biography
Rocha is a Paralympic footballer who won Bronze medal for being a participant at 2000 Summer Paralympics in Sydney, Australia and was awarded Silver medal for 2004 Summer Paralympics in Athens, Greece. During the 2004 season he have scored 4th goal when played against Argentina, which led his team to 4–0 win, but because of a brawl ended up in 4–1 defeat.

References

External links
 

20th-century births
Year of birth missing (living people)
Living people
Paralympic 7-a-side football players of Brazil
Paralympic silver medalists for Brazil
Paralympic bronze medalists for Brazil
Paralympic medalists in football 7-a-side
Date of birth missing (living people)
7-a-side footballers at the 2000 Summer Paralympics
7-a-side footballers at the 2004 Summer Paralympics
Medalists at the 2000 Summer Paralympics
Medalists at the 2004 Summer Paralympics
21st-century Brazilian people